Huilong is a town of Funan County in northwestern Anhui province, China, located  northwest of the county seat. On 6 July 2012, the provincial government approved the upgrade of Huilong, former a township, to a town. The town is nicknamed the "home of chili peppers" and has a rapidly growing industrial economy.

See also
List of township-level divisions of Anhui

References

Towns in Anhui
Funan County